Advanced RISC Computing (ARC) is a specification promulgated by a defunct consortium of computer manufacturers (the Advanced Computing Environment project), setting forth a standard MIPS RISC-based computer hardware and firmware environment. The firmware on Alpha machines that are compatible with ARC is known as AlphaBIOS, non-ARC firmware on Alpha is known as SRM.

History 
Although ACE went defunct, and no computer was ever manufactured which fully complied with the ARC standard, the ARC system has a widespread legacy in that all operating systems in the Windows NT family use ARC conventions for naming boot devices. SGI's modified version of the ARC firmware is named ARCS. All SGI computers which run IRIX 6.1 or later, such as the Indy and Octane, boot from an ARCS console, which uses the same drive naming conventions as Windows. Most of the various RISC-based computers designed to run Windows NT have versions of the ARC boot console to boot NT. These include the following:
 MIPS R4000-based systems such as the MIPS Magnum workstation
 all Alpha-based machines with a PCI bus designed prior to the end of support for Windows NT Alpha in September 1999 (the Alpha ARC firmware is also known as AlphaBIOS; non-ARC Alphas use SRM console instead)
 most Windows NT-capable PowerPC computers (such as the IBM RS/6000 40P).

It was predicted that Intel IA-32-based computers would adopt the ARC console, although only SGI ever marketed such machines with ARC firmware (namely, the SGI Visual Workstation series, which launched in 1999).

Comparison with UEFI 
Compared to UEFI, the ARC firmware also included support for FAT, boot variables, C-calling interface. It did not include the same level of extensibility as UEFI and the same level of governance like with the UEFI Forum.

List of partially ARC compatible computers 
Products complying (to some degree) with the ARC standard include these:

Alpha
DEC Multia and AlphaStation/AlphaServer
DeskStation Raptor
i386
SGI Visual Workstation
MIPS
Acer PICA
Carrera Computers, Inc Cobra R4000 and VIPER
Digital DECstation 5000
DeskStation Tyne
Microsoft Jazz
MIPS Magnum
Olivetti M700
NEC RISCstation
NeTpower Fastseries MP
SGI Indigo², Indy, Challenge, Onyx, Origin etc. Big-Endian ARCS
Siemens-Nixdorf RM200, RM300, RM400
PowerPC
IBM Personal Computer Power Series 850/830 PReP
IBM RS/6000 40P, 43P, E20, F30
 Motorola PowerStack
 Tangent MediaStar

References

External links
 ARC on www.linux-mips.org

 
Computer hardware standards